The Zamboanga del Sur - Pagadian Football Association is a Philippine provincial football association based in Pagadian in Zamboanga del Sur. Founded in 1999 it works under the Philippine Football Federation as a provincial football association for the Zamboanga del Sur province area. As of 2015 it is under the leadership of President Bayani Jose Abad and Secretary General Diole Dinglasa. The Zamboanga del Sur - Pagadian FA sends a team to represent the region in the yearly PFF National Men's Club Championship.

References

1999 establishments in the Philippines
Football governing bodies in the Philippines
Sports in Zamboanga del Sur